Suraj Singh (born 6 December 1995) is an Indian professional footballer who plays as a defender for Churchill Brothers in the I-League.

Career
Singh began his career with the Tata Football Academy. He soon joined Churchill Brothers after graduating from the academy. He made his senior competitive debut for the club in the I-League on 14 February 2017 against Chennai City. He started and played the full match as Churchill Brothers drew 1–1.

Career statistics

References

1995 births
Living people
Indian footballers
Churchill Brothers FC Goa players
Association football defenders
I-League players